William Michael Mulvey  (born August 23, 1949) is an American prelate of the Catholic Church who has served as bishop of the Diocese of Corpus Christi in Texas since 2010.

Biography

Early life and education
William Mulvey was born on August 23, 1949, in Houston, Texas, the second of six children of Daniel H. Mulvey Jr. and Marjorie Jane Patterson Mulvey. His siblings are Dan, Martha, John, Tim and Kim. He has 12 nieces and nephews. All of William Mulvey's education was completed at Catholic schools, including St. Theresa and St. Cecilia in Houston and St. Thomas High School in Houston (1963–1966). Mulvey was confirmed by Bishop Wendelin Nold at St. Cecilia Parish in Houston. 

Mulvey attended St. Edward's Catholic High School (1967) and St. Edward's University, both in Austin, Texas.  He graduated from St. Edward's in 1971 with a BBA. He attended seminary at the Pontifical North American College in Rome from 1971 to 1976, earning in 1974 his Bachelor of Sacred Theology degree from the Pontifical University of Saint Thomas Aquinas. In 1976, Mulvey received his Licentiate in Sacred Theology from the Pontifical Gregorian University.

Ordination and ministry
Mulvey was ordained to the priesthood for the Diocese of Austin on June 29, 1975, by Pope Paul VI in St. Peter's Square in Vatican City, one of 359 priests ordained by the Pope on that occasion.

As a priest of the Diocese of Austin, Mulvey had the following assignments:

1976–1977: Associate pastor of St. Mary/Our Lady of Guadalupe Parish in Taylor, Texas
1977–1980: Associate pastor of St. Louis Parish in Austin
1980–1981: Further studies on a sabbatical with the Focolare Movement
1981–1986: Chaplain to Bishop Louis Reicher Catholic High School in Waco, Texas
1984–1986: Pastor of St. Joseph in Waco
1986–1992: Director of spiritual formation at St. Mary's Seminary in Houston
1992–1995: Pastor of St. Thomas Aquinas in College Station, Texas
1995–1997: Associate director of the Center for Spirituality for Diocesan Priests of the Focolare Movement in Florence, Italy
1997–1999: Director of the Center for Spirituality for Diocesan Priests of the Focolare Movement in Hyde Park, New York
1999–2004: Pastor of St. Helen Parish in Georgetown, Texas
2004–2007: Chancellor of the diocese
2007–2009: Vicar general of the diocese
August 2009: Vice rector, St. Mary's Seminary in Houston
August 24, 2009: Elected administrator of the diocese

Mulvey is one of two former pastors of St. Thomas Aquinas Parish in College Station who were elevated to bishop. The other is Patrick Zurek, bishop of Amarillo.

Bishop of Corpus Christi
Mulvey was appointed as the bishop of the Diocese of Corpus Christi by Pope Benedict XVI on January 18, 2010. Mulvey was consecrated on March 25, 2010, by Cardinal Daniel DiNardo His principal co-consecrators were Archbishop Gregory Aymond and Bishop Edmond Carmody.

Mulvey is the first bishop of Corpus Christi to be named without prior episcopal experience since 1921, when Monsignor Emmanuel Ledvina was appointed to the position.

See also

 Catholic Church hierarchy
 Catholic Church in the United States
 Historical list of the Catholic bishops of the United States
 List of Catholic bishops of the United States
 Lists of patriarchs, archbishops, and bishops

References

External links 

 Bishop Michael Mulvey, STL, DD  Diocese of Corpus Christi  Corpus Christi, TX
 Diocese of Austin
 Diocese of Corpus Christi

Episcopal succession

Living people
1949 births
American Roman Catholic clergy of Irish descent
Pontifical Gregorian University alumni
St. Thomas High School (Houston, Texas) alumni
St. Edward's University alumni
Pontifical University of Saint Thomas Aquinas alumni
Catholics from Texas
21st-century Roman Catholic bishops in the United States